The National Bank of New Zealand Limited (NBNZ), often referred to as The National Bank, was one of New Zealand's largest banks. Throughout much of its history, the National Bank provided commercial banking services to mainly major industrial and rural as well as some personal customers.

UK-based Lloyds Bank became the sole owner of the bank in 1966 and National Bank adopted the Lloyds Bank black horse as its logo. Lloyds TSB, as it then was, sold the bank to Australian ANZ Bank in 2003, at which time it became part of ANZ National Bank Limited, the New Zealand subsidiary of Australia and New Zealand Banking Group but for customers retained a separate corporate identity until rebranding as ANZ began in September 2012. ANZ announced they would adopt National's technology system and the majority of its products.

The National Bank ceased to exist when it was subsumed into ANZ Bank New Zealand in 2012.

History

The successful flotation of the National Bank of New Zealand in London was announced in October 1872. It was to be a New Zealand bank and would begin by buying and expanding the operations of Dunedin's Bank of Otago. The new bank had been incorporated in London by a group of people including a number of high-profile former New Zealand residents, among them former Governor Thomas Gore Browne, former Speaker Charles Clifford and former Wellington Provincial Superintendent Isaac Featherston. Another board member was Edward Brodie Hoare of Barnetts, Hoares, Hanbury and Lloyd, Bankers. From the first New Zealand operations were managed from Dunedin. Adam Burnes was inspector and general manager.  The first branch away from Dunedin opened in Wellington in March 1873 with Alexander Kerr as its first manager. Although  "harmonised" it did not technically acquire the 13 branches of the Bank of Otago until 1 July 1873. Branches were also opened in 1873 in Auckland and Hamilton and Christchurch. The National Bank of New Zealand (Ltd) Act gave it the right to issue banknotes redeemable (in specie or gold). Though the bank was technically domiciled in London (which provided certain advantages) the major portion of its shareholders were New Zealand resident or associated. In 1894 its headquarters were moved from Dunedin to Wellington.

Lloyds Bank acquired a small interest in The National Bank in 1919. There was a steady substantial drain of New Zealand shareholdings to the National Bank of New Zealand overseas share register throughout the 1950s and early 1960s This situation continued until 1966, when Lloyds Bank purchased The National Bank outright. In 1967 National Bank and the Bank of New Zealand established joint data processing services operated by Databank Systems Limited. The other trading banks joined the now proven computer system and ownership of Databank the following year.

The bank tentatively dipped a toe into foreign waters in 1969 when it established a branch in Rarotonga, Cook Islands. This foray ended in 1986 when it sold its banking license in Rarotonga to European Pacific Banking Co.

The head office was moved from London to Wellington in 1978 and the Black Horse became its emblem. The Black Horse logo dates back to 1677 London when Humphrey Stockes adopted it as the sign for his shop. Stokes was a goldsmith and 'keeper of the running cashes', a banker. When Lloyds Bank took over his site in 1884 it kept the horse as its symbol.

The National Bank acquired Southpac Investment Management Limited in 1983. Five years later it bought The Rural Bank Limited, the former New Zealand Government owned bank, from Fletcher Challenge. It continued consolidating banking in NZ by purchasing Countrywide Banking Corporation from Bank of Scotland in 1998.

In 2003 ANZ bought The National Bank from Lloyds TSB. ANZ also bought the right to continue to use the Black Horse logo for seven years.

In 2005, Chief Executive Sir John Anderson retired. He had been Chief Executive of The National Bank since its acquisition of the Rural Bank and was head of the ANZ-National Bank's New Zealand operations. Graham Hodges became the new Chief Executive Officer.

In March 2009, Hodges was named deputy chief executive for the ANZ group. Jenny Fagg took over as CEO for Hodges.

In September 2012, ANZ National Bank CEO David Hisco announced that it would drop The National Bank brand in favour of the ANZ brand over the next two years.

Advertising and sponsorship

The National Bank was the sponsor of New Zealand Cricket and sponsors all the home tournaments of the country and the Black Caps, the national men's cricket team. ANZ, as its successor, has continued this since 2012. The National Bank sponsored the National Bank of New Zealand Netball Cup. The sponsorship also has continued with ANZ, and also expanded to ANZ Championship, the Trans-Taman professional netball league until 2016, and remains as the primary sponsor of ANZ Premiership since 2017. 

The National Bank's television advertisements used the music of Vivaldi's The Four Seasons.

Note

References

External links

 ANZ Bank New Zealand Limited
 ANZ Media Release September 2012

Defunct banks of New Zealand
Banks established in 1872
New Zealand companies established in 1872
Companies based in Auckland
Companies based in Dunedin
Companies based in Wellington
Australia and New Zealand Banking Group
Lloyds Banking Group
Banks disestablished in 2012
New Zealand subsidiaries of foreign companies
1966 mergers and acquisitions
2003 mergers and acquisitions